Beach Fever is a 1987 English-language American comedy film that was directed by Alexander Tabrizi. It stars Kato Kaelin and Rodney Ueno with Nina Arvesen. Primarily set on the beaches of California, the film's central plot involves a father sending his son to America to find the best "pick up line" for his father. Then stumbling on a special formula that attracts girls, the plot thickens when a mad dash on the beach for this special cologne causes problems for Chat and Sake. The film was produced by Nelson Anderson, Yakov Bentsvi and Aaron Biston, written by Francis X. Cronan and Larry W. Talbot.

Plot
A young Japanese entrepreneur is set on a quest by his wealthy father to find the world's best opening line in order to "get the girl". But when they stumble upon a sure-fire love potion, mayhem ensues.

Cast
 Kato Kaelin as Chat Frederick IV
 Rodney Ueno as Sake
 Judea Brittain as Sandy
 Jeffrey Asch as Ernie
 Aaron Biston as Mario
 Nina Arvesen as Decent Girl number 2

References

External links
 
 
 Beach Fever (VHS) Kato Kaelin

1987 films
1980s sex comedy films
American sex comedy films
1980s English-language films
Films shot in Los Angeles
Beach party films
Teensploitation
Teen sex comedy films
1987 comedy films
1980s American films